Gambin is a surname.

List of people with the surname 

 Luke Gambin (born 1993), English footballer
 Ryan Gambin (born 1985), Australian swimmer
 Sherry Gambin-Walsh, Canadian politician

See also 

 Gambino

Surnames
Surnames of English origin